Waterford High School (WHS) is a public high school in Waterford, Washington County, Ohio.  It is the only high school in the Wolf Creek Local School District.  Their mascot is the Wildcat, and their official school colors are green and white.

Athletics

The Wildcats belong to the Ohio High School Athletic Association (OHSAA) and the Tri-Valley Conference, a 16-member athletic conference located in southeastern Ohio.  The conference is divided into two divisions based on school size.  The Ohio Division features the larger schools and the Hocking Division features the smaller schools, including Waterford.

Athletic History
Their rival is the Beverly Fort Frye Cadets. They play each other every year in a showdown known as "The Battle of the Muskingum River." In recent times, the 2016 Boys Varsity Football Team completed a record breaking season, going 11–2, the best a Waterford football team has ever done. They hosted Waterford's first ever home playoff game against Zanesville Bishop Rosecrans and claimed victory 13–9. The team came to its farthest point as the regional runners-up to Canal Winchester Harvest Preparatory.

OHSAA State Champions
 Girls' Basketball – 2016 (28–1); 2022 (26–3)

OHSAA State Runners-Up
 Girls' Basketball – 2015 (27–2), 2017 (25–4)
 Boys' Wrestling – J.D. Pinkerton (140 lbs.), 1993

Noted Alumni
 Wilbur Cooper (1910) – MLB Pitcher for the Pittsburgh Pirates, Chicago Cubs, and Detroit Tigers.

See also
 Ohio High School Athletic Conferences

Notes and references

External links
 District Website

High schools in Washington County, Ohio
Public high schools in Ohio